Hilda Aurora Vidal Valdés (born August 13, 1941, in Havana, Cuba) is a Cuban artist, specializing in painting, drawing, design, sculpture, collage, artistic tapestry, and papier mache.

Vidal from 1959 to 1961, studied fashion design and interior design at the Lily del Barrio's American Academy in Havana, Cuba, and in 1961, studied scenography and theater wardrobe at the Sala Arlequín in Havana, Cuba. She was married to fellow Cuban painter Manuel Vidal.

In 2021, the National Museum of Fine Arts of Cuba acquires two oil on canvas works by Hilda Vidal.

Individual exhibitions
 1975 – "Pinturas de Hilda Vidal"; Galería La Rampa, Hotel Habana Libre, Havana, Cuba.
 1978 – "Paseo por el Sol. Oleos de Hilda Vidal"; Centro de Arte Internacional, Havana, Cuba.
 1997 – "La Pintura de la Artista Cubana – Hilda Vidal", BoyCott Art Gallery, Brussels, Belgium.
 1997 – "El Tiempo que me Interroga. Pinturas y Dibujos de Hilda Vidal"; Galeria La Acacia, Havana, Cuba.

Collective exhibitions
She was part of many collective exhibitions:
 1974 – IV Salón Nacional Juvenil de Artes Plásticas, Museo Nacional de Bellas Artes de La Habana, Havana, Cuba.
 1988 – "Creadoras Cubanas. Pintura y Escultura", Museo Nacional de Bellas Artes de La Habana, Havana, Cuba.
 1992 – Bienal Iberoamericana de Arte, Museo Metropolitano de México, Mexico City, Mexico.
 1998 – "Tributo a la Danza", in the Galería Habana, Havana, Cuba.

Awards
 1976 – First Prize; Exposición Concurso Muñecas de Trapo, Museo de Artes Decorativas, Havana, Cuba.
 1983 – Honorable Mention in Painting; Salón de la Ciudad, Centro Provincial de Artes Plásticas y Diseño, Havana, Cuba.

References
 Diario Granma, Hilda Vidal en Pequeño Espacio; February 5, 2004 
 Cuadros de Leonardo, Pinturas de Hilda Vidal, Editor Gerardo Mosquera, 1985, Centro de Arte 23 y 12; Havana, Cuba. 
 Jose Viegas; Memoria: Artes Visuales Cubanas Del Siglo Xx; (California Intl Arts 2004);

External links

 
 Sapiens website on artist 
 Cuba New Headlines article 
 Granma International article 
 Granma International article 
 La Jiribilla article 
 La Jiribilla article 
 La Jiribilla article 

1941 births
Living people
20th-century Cuban women artists
21st-century Cuban women artists
Artists from Havana
Cuban contemporary artists
Cuban painters
Modern painters
Cuban women painters